The Timmins Rock are a Junior "A" ice hockey team from Timmins, Ontario, Canada. They are a part of the Northern Ontario Junior Hockey League (NOJHL).

History
The Timmins Golden Bears became members of the NOJHL in 1991. The Golden Bears won their league championship in 1995. In 1999, the Timmins Golden Bears relocated to Iroquois Falls, Ontario, and became the Iroquois Falls Jr. Eskies. After three seasons, the Jr. Eskies re-branded as the Abitibi Eskimos. Attendance improved and the Eskimos played good-quality hockey. The Eskimos hosted the 2007 Dudley Hewitt Cup, but lost the semi-finals to the Schreiber Diesels. Three years later in 2009–10, the Eskimos clinched first overall and won the NOJHL championship over the Soo Thunderbirds, who were hosting the Dudley Hewitt Cup. The Eskimos would finish 4th in the 2010 Dudley Hewitt Cup tournament. The Eskimos never made the NOJHL finals again.

In March 2015, the Abitibi Eskimos announced they were relocating back to Timmins after 16 years in Iroquois Falls. The Timmins NOJHL franchise announced that they were not going to name the team the Timmins Golden Bears, and named the team the Timmins Rock instead when unveiling the team name, colors and jerseys at an event.

The Rock finished their first season in Timmins with a 29–24–1 record, which was good for 4th place in the NOJHL East Division. The Rock swept the Iroquois Falls Eskis in the 1st round of the playoffs, winning 8–1 at home in game one, and 3–1 in Iroquois Falls. However the Cochrane Crunch would be too much for them to handle in the next round, and they defeated the Rock in 4 straight. Jordan Rendle would pace the team with 30 goals, while Zachary Kercz had a team high 55 assists and 81 points. Logan Ferrington appeared in net 35 times for the Rock, and finished with a 20–13–1 record with a 3.94 GAA. The Rock averaged 595 fans per game at the McIntyre Arena, second highest in the league. Kercz would also be awarded a place on the CCM 2nd All-Star Team at the end of the season.

In the 2016–17 season, the Rock finished the regular season with a record of 36–16–3–1 and 76 points, third in the East Division and fourth overall. In the playoffs, they upset the Cochrane Crunch in six games and advanced to the divisional finals where they were swept in four games against regular season champion Powassan Voodoos.

Head coach Paul Gagne retired at the end of the 2016–17 season and Ryan Woodard was named as his replacement, however, in May 2017 he was fired before the season for a non-hockey related matter. Corey Beer was hired as the next head coach in the 2017–18 season. Beer was previously an associate coach of the Cobourg Cougars in the Ontario Junior Hockey League that had won the 2017 Royal Bank Cup. He left before the abbreviated 2020–21 season for the Okanaghan Hockey Academy and the team completed the season without a head coach. Brandon Perry was then hired as the head coach and general manager for the 2021–22 season.

Season-by-season results

Notable alumni 

 Dan Cloutier
 Steve Sullivan

References

External links

Timmins Rock webpage

Northern Ontario Junior Hockey League teams
1991 establishments in Ontario
Ice hockey clubs established in 1991
Ice hockey teams in Ontario
Sport in Timmins